Libyan Premier League 2007/2008 was the 40th edition of the Libyan Premier League, the highest division of Libyan football, organised by the Libyan Football Federation.

Season summary
In a more closely contested league contest than in recent seasons, Al Ittihad took until week 28 to secure their 14th league title. Al Ahly Tripoli challenged their close rivals all the way in the title race, but just four points from their last three games, including a humiliating 1-0 defeat to eventually relegated Al Tahaddy, ended their title hopes and their 29-game unbeaten record, which had lasted all year. Al Ittihad also went through the league season unbeaten. After just one defeat in the 2006-07 season, this shows signs that the Big Two are pulling even further away, proved by the 20-point gap between 2nd placed Al Ahly Tripoli and 3rd placed Al Ahly Benghazi.

2007-08 was a very successful season for Khaleej Sirte. The club won two trophies (its first major honours since the three Sirte clubs merged to form Khaleej Sirte). The club won the Libyan Confederation Cup, a newly created trophy similar to England's League Cup, before later lifting the Libyan Cup, beating Al Madina in a tense final 1-0.

At the bottom, Al Suqoor and Nojom Ajdabiya both had very poor seasons, with just 9 wins between the two sides. Al Suqoor suffered one of the worst defeats in Libyan history, as they were crushed 10-2 by A Ahli Tripoli. Al Urouba did put up a decent fight, winning 4 of their last 7 matches, nearly half of the number of wins they had obtained in their previous 23 matches. In the end, they paid the price for losing to relegation rivals.

The Relegation/Promotion play-off place was an interesting battle. Three teams were on 33 points, and it was head-to-head record that sent Al Tahaddy to their eventual relegation.

In general, the league was pretty close, with just 10 points separating 5th placed Khaleej Sirte from 14th placed (and relegated) Al Urouba.

The competition
There are 16 clubs in the League. During the course of the season each clubs plays others two times, for a total of 30 games. At the end of season, the bottom three sides are automatically relegated to the Libyan Second Division, and the fourth bottom side goes into the Relegation play-off.

The winner of the LPL qualifies for the CAF Champions League, and the top two sides qualify for the Arab Champions League, while the Libyan Cup winner qualifies for the CAF Confederation Cup

Clubs

Statistics
First Match: Al Ahly Tripoli vs. Nojom Ajdabiya - September 20, 2007
First Referee: Naaji al Khabaat - Al Ahly Tripoli vs. Nojom Ajdabiya - September 20, 2007
First Goal Scored: Ali Hussein Rehema for Al Ahly Tripoli against Nojom Ajdabiya - September 20, 2007
Last Goal Scored: Reyad Ellafi for Al Ittihad against Nojom Ajdabiya - July 22, 2008
First Sending Off: Aqila Bousedrah for Nojom Ajdabiya against Al Ahly Tripoli - September 20, 2007
Total Number of Goals Scored: 618 (480 matches played - average 1.2875 goals per game)
Most Goals Scored by One Team: 77 goals - Al Ahly Tripoli
Fewest Goals Conceded by One Team: 16 goals - Al Ittihad
Most Goals Conceded by One Team: 69 goals - Al Suqoor
Biggest Scoreline: Al Ahly Tripoli 10 - 2 Al Suqoor - December 12, 2007
Most Wins: 26 - Al Ittihad
Most Draws: 13 - Al Madina
Most Defeats: 23 - Nojom Ajdabiya

League table

Results

Top goalscorers

 21 goals
  Abdelhameed Zidane (Akhdar)
18 goals
  William de Souza (Al Tahaddy)
16 goals
  Ahmed Saad (Ahly Tripoli)
13 goals
  Abdelmajid Eddine (Olomby)
12 goals
  Pierre Koulibaly (Ittihad)
  Osama al Fazzani (Ahly Tripoli)
  Mohamed Zubya (Ittihad)
11 goals
  Mahdi Karim (Ahly Tripoli)

Awards
Best Foreign Player (sponsored by Libyana & Al Madar) -  Mahdi Karim (Al Ahly Tripoli)
Golden Boot -  Abdelhameed Zidane (Al Akhdar) - 21 goals
Goal of the Season -  Mahdi Karim for Al Ahly Tripoli vs. Al Madina - January 4, 2008
Young Player of the Year -  Sapol Mani of Al Ittihad

External links
LPL 2007/2008 Standing @ Goalzz.com
RSSSF overview

Libyan Premier League seasons
Libya
1